The Sarawak section of the Federal Route 1, Asian Highway Route AH 150, also known as Pan Borneo Highway Sarawak or Sarawak First Trunk Road, is a 1077-km federal highway in Sarawak, Malaysia, making the highway as the longest component of the Malaysian portion of the larger Pan Borneo Highway network. Construction of the highway began in 1965 after Sarawak became a member of the federation of Malaysia in 1963.

The combined length of the Pan Borneo Highway Sarawak and its Sabahan counterpart forms the longest federal highway in Malaysia, with the total length of 1,503 km.

The Pan Borneo Highway Sarawak is notable for having three separate segments, sandwiched by two segments of Bruneian Pan-Borneo Highway. The Federal Route 1 was built in sections, comprising 92 sections altogether. Generally, all other federal and state highways in Sarawak serve as tributaries of the Federal Route 1. The highway is the only east-west oriented highway in Sarawak and links most of the division capitals in Sarawak except Kapit and Mukah. The sections from Miri to Limbang and to Lawas are connected by Brunei highway networks. At the Sarawak-Sabah border at Merapok, motorists must pass an immigration checkpoint to enter Sabah and vice versa. The highway continues as Malaysia Federal Route 1 (Sabah) in Sindumin.

History

The Sarawak Pan-Borneo Highway was built due to the lack of the intercity highway network in Sarawak. Initially, the intercity highway plan in Sarawak only existed after the Second World War ended in 1945, after Sarawak was ceded to Britain to become a British Crown Colony.

The construction of the first intercity trunk highway in Sarawak was commenced in 1965, dubbed as the "First Trunk Road". Most of the highway network in Sarawak was constructed within the decades of 1960s to 1980s. The Lawas–Merapok–Sindumin section was completed in 1981 while the final missing link from Sibu to Bintulu was completed in 1985. However, the highway had not been fully paved with asphalt yet at that time; it was only by the end of Sixth Malaysia Plan (RMK6) in 1995 that the FT1 highway in Sarawak was fully paved.

Before 1996, all routes in the Pan-Borneo Highway network in Malaysia, including Sarawak Pan-Borneo Highway, were state highways. After the Federal Roads Act 1959 was made effective in Sabah and Sarawak in 1984, those highways were re-gazetted as federal highways in 1996 with the route number of FT1 (from Sematan to Kudat through Brunei), FT13 (Mile 32 Sandakan to Tawau) and FT22 (Tamparuli to Sandakan). Those highways were later gazetted as a part of Asian Highway Network Route AH150.

Although some sections had been upgraded to divided highways, the Sarawak Pan-Borneo Highway was notorious for its poor condition in many sections. The overall condition in many sections of the Malaysian section of the Highway was poor with many potholes, because most sections of the highway were built with standards as low as JKR R3 (design speed limit: 70 km/h; minimum lane width: 3.0 m). A study to upgrade the entire highway to a super two highway under JKR R5 standard (design speed limit: 100 km/h; minimum lane width: 3.5 m) was done, which was expected to cost RM16 billion. Ultimately, the Malaysian federal government had opted to upgrade the Pan-Borneo Highway to a divided highway. The upgrade works of the Sarawak Pan-Borneo Highway to a divided highway is expected to be completed by 2023, with the overall cost of RM27 billion including its Sabahan counterparts.

Sections of the Federal Route 1 in Sarawak
There are 93 sections that form the entire Federal Route 1 in Sarawak:-

See also

 Pan Borneo Highway
 Malaysia Federal Route 1 (Sabah)
 Malaysia Federal Route 22
 Malaysia Federal Route 13 (Sabah)

References

Roads in Sarawak
Highways in Malaysia